Mary's Mount is a historic home at Harwood, Anne Arundel County, Maryland, United States. The earliest portion of Mary's Mount was built in 1771 for Col. Richard Harwood as a -story gambrel roof structure. The Bird family was to take possession of this property from 1820 to 1965. Jacob Wheeler Bird enlarged the house to its present two-story height in the early 19th century. The enlargements included two northern additions, each section of which is lower than its neighbor to the south, creating a "telescope" effect.

Mary's Mount was listed on the National Register of Historic Places in 1969.

Gallery

References

External links
 , including undated photo, at Maryland Historical Trust

Houses on the National Register of Historic Places in Maryland
Houses in Anne Arundel County, Maryland
Houses completed in 1742
1742 establishments in Maryland
National Register of Historic Places in Anne Arundel County, Maryland